Roger Alvin LeClerc (October 1, 1936 – January 21, 2021) was an American football player in the National Football League (NFL). He played as a center, linebacker, and kicker and coached at the college level for one season.

Playing career
LeClerc played eight seasons for the Chicago Bears in the National Football League (NFL). He was primarily the placekicker in an era when straight ahead kicking under 50 yards was the preferred style. During his playing career the soccer style kicking that is familiar today was already being used by teams. He was the second leading scorer in team history for years with 377 points, but with the modern game, he has slipped to 8th place. His best season was 1965.

Coaching career
LeClerc was the head football coach at Westfield State University in Westfield, Massachusetts for one season, in 1982, compiling a record of 2–7.

Later life
After he retired, LeClerc was a math teacher in Agawam, Massachusetts school system for 30 years. His son played College football as a quarterback at the University of New Hampshire.

LeClerc died on January 21, 2021.

Head coaching record

References

External links
 

1936 births
2021 deaths
American football centers
American football linebackers
American football placekickers
Chicago Bears players
Denver Broncos (AFL) players
Trinity Bantams football players
Westfield State Owls football coaches
People from Agawam, Massachusetts
Sportspeople from Springfield, Massachusetts
Coaches of American football from Massachusetts
Players of American football from Massachusetts
Schoolteachers from Massachusetts